Skarbøvik Church is a chapel of the Church of Norway in Ålesund Municipality in Møre og Romsdal county, Norway. It is located in the village of Skarbøvik on the island of Heissa. It is an annex chapel for the Ålesund parish which is part of the Nordre Sunnmøre prosti (deanery) in the Diocese of Møre. The brick church was built in a long church design in 1995 using plans drawn up by the architect Oskar Norderval. The church seats about 150 people. The church is a privately-run chapel that is overseen by a foundation rather than by the parish.

See also
List of churches in Møre

References

Buildings and structures in Ålesund
Churches in Møre og Romsdal
Long churches in Norway
Brick churches in Norway
20th-century Church of Norway church buildings
Churches completed in 1995
1995 establishments in Norway